Vyt Bakaitis (born 1940) is an American translator, editor, and poet born in Lithuania and living in New York City. His first collection of poetry City Country (1991) was followed by Deliberate Proof (2010).  Thirst, the magazine he co-edited with Benjamin Sloan, lasted only a few issues, but his translations of Lithuanian poetry are significant; particularly the 20th-century anthology Breathing Free (2001), which he also edited. Three additional volumes he translated from the Lithuanian are by contemporary poets Jonas Mekas and Julius Keleras. 

In 2022, he published Refuge and Occasion (SPD Press). He was married to the late artist Sharon Gilbert.

Poetry
 Bakaitis, Vyt, City Country. New York City : Black Thistle Press, 1991. 146 p. 
 Bakaitis, Vyt, Deliberate Proof. Brooklyn, NY : Lunar Chandelier Press, 2010. 135 p.

Translations
 Gyvas atodūsis : lietuvių poezijos vertimai / sudarė ir į anglų kalbą vertė Vyt Bakaitis = Breathing free : poems from the Lithuanian / selected and translated by Vyt Bakaitis. Vilnius : Lietuvos Rašytojų sąjungos leidykla, 2001. 524 p. 
 Keleras, Julius, Eilėraščiai XL English & Lithuanian. XL Poems; translated from Lithuanian by Vyt Bakaitis ; foreword by Rimvydas Šilbajoris. Vilnius : Lithuanian Writers' Association Press, 1998. 128 p. 
 Mekas, Jonas, Semeniškių idilės. English & Lithuanian. There is no Ithaca : Idylls of Semeniskiai & Reminiscences ; translated from Lithuanian by Vyt Bakaitis ; foreword by Czeslaw Milosz. New York City : Black Thistle Press, 1996. 181 p. 
 Mekas, Jonas, Daybooks 1979-1972; translated from Lithuanian by Vyt Bakaitis ; with illustrations. Brooklyn, NY : Portable Press at Yo-Yo Labs, 2003. Unpaginated

Notes

External links
Poems by Vyt Bakaitis
Druskininkai Poetic Fall 2001
Boston Review, December 1997/ January 1998 – Review by Mary Maxwell of There Is No Ithaca: Idylls of Semeniskiai and Reminiscences by Jonas Mekas, Translated by Vyt Bakaitis
The Drunken Boat, Poetry from Lithuania – Winter 2002, selected by J.C. Todd – includes translations by Bakaitis
           Olson, Ray. "There Is No Ithaca: Idylls of Semeniskiai and Reminiscences." Booklist 93.n4 (Oct 15, 1996): 400(1). Expanded Academic ASAP. Thomson Gale. TORONTO PUBLIC LIBRARIES (CELPLO). 13 Dec. 2006 Review of book translated by Bakaitis

Living people
1940 births
Poets from New York (state)
Lithuanian translators
Lithuanian emigrants to the United States
Lithuanian–English translators

20th-century American poets